This is a list of the largest China-based law firms by revenue in 2017.

See also
List of largest law firms by revenue
List of largest United States-based law firms by profits per partner
List of largest United Kingdom-based law firms by revenue
List of largest Canada-based law firms by revenue
List of largest Europe-based law firms by revenue
List of largest Japan-based law firms by head count

References

Chinese
Law firms